Ali Rıza Pasha (1860–1932) was an Ottoman military officer and statesman, who was one of the last Grand Viziers of the Ottoman Empire, under the reign of the last Ottoman Sultan Mehmed VI, between 14 October 1919 and 2 March 1920.

Biography 

He was born in 1860 in Istanbul, son of a major. He graduated from the Ottoman Military College in 1886. He held military and administrative posts such as the Governorship of Manastır in 1903, after which he was exiled to Libya upon the pressure exercised by Russia, since the Russian consul of the city had been assassinated during his tenure. In 1905, he was appointed to Yemen where he suppressed an uprising. With the beginning of the Second Constitutional Era in the Ottoman Empire in 1908, he became the Minister of War in grand vizier Kıbrıslı Mehmed Kamil Pasha's government but had to be removed due to objections raised by the Committee of Union and Progress. He was re-appointed to the same ministry in Hüseyin Hilmi Pasha's cabinet in 1909 but gave his demission because of the 31 March Incident. Appointed as supervisor for the European armies of the Ottoman Empire, the Balkan Wars erupted before he even had the time to assume his duties. Never favored by the Committee of Union and Progress, his career succumbed to silence during the single-party regime of the Ottoman Empire during World War I. He was appointed as grand vizier on 2 October 1919, a post he held for five months.

In terms of effective shaping of policies by the remaining Ottoman state structure, his office (as well as his successor Hulusi Salih Pasha's) are usually considered as mere intervals between the two offices of Damat Ferid Pasha, the signatory of the Treaty of Sèvres.

See also
 List of Ottoman Grand Viziers
 Second Constitutional Era (Ottoman Empire)

References

1860 births
1932 deaths
Politicians from Istanbul
Ottoman Military Academy alumni
Ottoman Military College alumni
Ottoman Army generals
Pashas
Ottoman military personnel of the Balkan Wars
Field marshals of the Ottoman Empire
20th-century Grand Viziers of the Ottoman Empire
Ottoman governors of Yemen
Members of the Senate of the Ottoman Empire
Military personnel from Istanbul